Akbarpura, or Akbarpūra is a village, which is located roughly  northeast of Peshawar and is part of Pabbi Tehsil of Nowshera District of Khyber Pakhtunkhwa in Pakistan.  Akbarpura is named after the Mughal Emperor Akbar, who camped there before going to Afghanistan. It was known originally as Sapalikhera. Akbarpura is noted for its Sufi shrines Baba Saib and Nanga Baba.

Overview and history

Religion 
The entire population of Akbarpura is Sunni Muslims. Before the Pakistan-India partition there were several Hindu families residing in the village but most of them left for India after its independence, other Hindu families converted to Islam.

Borders and Population 
Akbarpura is one of the densely populated villages in District Nowshera, and serves as a local  business hub for the surrounding villages. Some main villages located around Akbarpua are Zakhi Miyana, Zahki Qabristan, Zakhi Kohna, Camp Korona, Zakhi Charbagh, Gari Momin, Jabba, Kandar, Tarkha, Natal, Khoshmakam.

Several families/castes are presented in Akbarpura: 

 Bukhari Syeds (40%–45%); 
 The Mians (Miangaan) the descendants of a well known saint Syed Abdul Wahab known as Akhund Panjo Baba (25–30%); 
 Other castes including The Qazi, Parachas, Jhakars, Awan, Bajoury.

Sufism 
Among the Sufi shrines are Akhund Panju Baba, Nanga Baba, Nadan Shaheed. Every day hundreds of people do visit these shrines to pay their respect to the Sufis. Abdul Wahab alias Akhund Panju Baba was a famous Sufi and preacher of Islam. Thousands of Hindus embraced Islam on his hand. Baba sahib migrated from  Sawabi during Gaju Khan era due to Clashes between Ghazi Khan (Akhund Panju's father) and Gaju Khan to Akbarpura, he started his teachings and preaching from the Misri Pura area of Akbarpura, where today his tomb is present. Akhund Panju's descendants are locally called as Miangaan. 

The main and noted events of the year are the annual Urss of Akhund Panju Baba and Nanga Baba. Both shrines located at the entrance of the village and at the night of Urss thousands do visits to attend the Urss and pray. Akhund Panju Baba Urss is famous for its Milad and the speeches of religious scholars while the Urs of Naga Baba is famous for its Legendary Qawali. The famous Qawal of Pakistan Aziz Mian was a regular visitor/Performer of the Nanga Baba Urss.

The tombs of Akhund Panju Baba and Nanga Baba are an excellent examples of sub-continent art work, The inside roof and walls of Akhund Panju Baba tomb has been decorated and painted with traditional and cultural blue color flowers and designs centuries ago, while the glass work at Nanga Baba tomb is a classic example of the glass artists of Pakistan. Nadan Shaheed is the third famous shrine of the village and is located on the outskirt of the village.

As he preached the truth of his forefathers, fanatics became his enemy. He was martyred & shot dead with 7 Revolver bullets in his body. He left two sons Syed Muzaffar Ali Shah Bukhari (Divisional Superintendent Railways Lahore Division.) and second Syed Hamid Ali Shah Bukhari Alias Syed Ansar Ali Shah Bukhari (Chairman West Pakistan Railways).

His Elder son Syed Muzaffar Ali Shah Bukhari's shrine is in Garhi Momin a nearby Village.

Built about 400 years ago, Pokh Jumaat (stone mosque) of Akbarpura has sunk more than four feet since its establishment. Its main hall now requires four steps down for someone to enter. The mosque is subsiding at a rate equivalent to the size of a wheat grain (3 mm) per year according to one local resident.

Giving the scientific explanation, Dr Mohammad Iqbal, deputy chief geologist Pakistan Petroleum Limited, says that the mosque is slowly sinking due to the depletion of the water level beneath it. Giant aquifers that serve as water reservoirs are being emptied faster than they can be refilled, causing the earth to sink, he says, adding it seems that it is built on layers of clay and highly permeable sand and gravel that easily compress when fluid is withdrawn.

Education 
There are higher secondary school for Boys and girls, several government primary schools, and four private schools. Most of the children receive basic and secondary education in village and majority joins colleges in Peshawar, Nowshera and Pabbi. The High school of Akbarpua has brought up talents.

There is now a degree college for boys, however, several hundred students daily visits to Peshawar, Nowshera, and Pabbi for attending the degree colleges .

Development 
Akbarpura can be described as under developed area of District Nowshera despite the fact that it is the largest village of District Nowshera in respect of Population. This underdevelopment is mainly in the area of road construction and sewerage system. Bad shaped roads and sewerage system are the biggest problem of the village. The main road of the village is totally destroyed by moving of Heavy Machinery and raw material for the construction of Peshawar-Islamabad motorway. The motorway has been completed in 2007, but the main road of Akbarpura is still in ruins and presents a view of small lakes during the rainy season. Sewerage system is totally insufficient for the growing population and construction of residential houses/colonies housing without planning. Hepatitis C, stomach problems, eye diseases, skin diseases are very common among the villagers due to lack of sewerage system and no access to clean drinking water.

The village has developed notably. Firstly, the majority of streets have been paved. Secondly, progress has been made in education, and there are schools in the private sector as well as higher secondary schools for children. 

Along with education, business opportunities have also increased. Almost every livelihood item can be found and purchased inside the village. Also, a high increase in Gold smith, Furniture, Garments, grocery shops has been observed during the last decade. Because of such developments and construction of business markets, Akbarpura has become a shopping hub for the residents of the nearby villages and brought a large number of investments and business opportunities for the residents of Akbarpura.

A comprehensive clinic/hospital has been established in 2008. This has contributed to the further development of Akbarpura.

All residents are provided with electricity as well as land line telephone service - which is available with all the cellular companies operating in Pakistan. A PTCL internet service along with wireless internet facilities are available, and is in use by many residents. A natural gas project is nearing its completion stage, and it is estimated that by the end of 2010, natural gas will be available for every resident of the village.

Culture 
The traditional practice of Pukhtoonwali is followed by every resident. Guests are received and treated as special entities and are warmly welcomed. The main cultural event of Akbarpura is a four day festival on the occasion of Eid Ul Fitar. Tens of thousands visit and participate in the festival, which is locally knows and "Mela".  "Mela" brings happiness, entertainment and trading opportunities for all the attendees. There are sweet stands as well as traditional foods stands (Chapli Kabab, Bar B Que Tikka, etc.) . This Mela also takes place on Eid Ul Azha as well but not with the scale of Eid Ul Fitar's Mela. Other cultural activities are the marriages which were enjoyed with great enthusiasm being decorated by great Food, dances and Music.

Agriculture 
Akbarpura is known for its fertile land and fruit orchards, Plum, Peach, Pear and loquat are the famous and common. Other Harvesting includes Wheat, Maize, Sugar cane, Vegetables etc. Several tube wells along with a canal irrigation system has turned the land of Akbarpura into one of the best cultivated lands in the province.

Sports 
Cricket is the most popular game in the area, followed by volleyball and badminton. Annual cricket tournament at Akbarpura higher secondary school is a famous event in entire region, and teams from different districts and cities participate in the tournament. Various volleyball tournaments also take place around the year. The need of a Cricket stadium and volleyball court has been felt from quite a long period, but still no such stadium or court exists. No activity for women sport has been recorded in the history of Akbarpura, there is a need of a separate ground for women who wants/love to participate in sport events.

Govt. Higher Secondary School Akbarpura stood first in the N.W.F.P Cricket tournament held in 2001.

Rivers 
The main river is the Bara River, which flows right through the middle of the village. It originates in the Terah Valley of Bara Tehsil. The Kabul River also flows in the northern part of the village.

The main river of Akbarpura is Bara River which flows right in the middle of the village. The Bara River originates from Terah Valley of Tehsil Bara and is thus named as Bara River. It is a normal flowing river with a high activity of flood in monsoon, a very well maintained flood control wall has been constructed to stop the water from entering the populated area of the village. Some three decades ago this river was seen having crystal clear water, but due to high growth in population the river has become a sanitation channel and most of the wastage water of the village has been diverted to Bara river which has destroyed its purity and presently it looks like a drainage canal. Kabul River or Abaseen is a symbol of NWFP Province, this Kabul river flows on the northern edge of the village. This is a famous hunting ground for migratory birds, hunters from Peshawar gathers in winter for hunting sport. Fishing can also be experienced on the banks of River Kabul. It's a common walking/visiting spot for the people of Akbarpura. An irrigation canal also travels like a snake around the village; this canal is known as Warsak Canal and is one of the main irrigation systems present in the village which irrigates 60% of main cultivation.

References

Populated places in Nowshera District